These are the international rankings of Uganda

International rankings

References

Uganda